The Women's trap event at the 2010 South American Games was held on March 22 at 9:00.

Medalists

Results

Qualification

Final

References
Qualification
Final

Trap W